Virginia Hey (born 19 June 1952) is an Australian actress, known for her role as Pa'u Zotoh Zhaan in the science fiction television series Farscape, playing the "Warrior Woman" in Mad Max 2: The Road Warrior, and various roles in television drama series, such as lawyer Jennifer St James in E Street.

Career 
Hey began her career as a fashion model after being discovered at a bus stop by POL magazine editor Wendy Adnam. Hey appeared on several magazine covers and started her acting career in television advertisements (57 in all), television dramas and films in Australia and the UK.

In 1979, Hey appeared in live TV performances with The Buggles for their song "Video Killed the Radio Star", including on the BBC's Top of the Pops and on German television.  However, she does not appear in the official music video. (The official video for the same song is remembered best for being the first music video broadcast on MTV in 1981.)

Her film and television credits include the Warrior Woman in Mad Max 2: The Road Warrior and General Pushkin's girlfriend in the Bond film The Living Daylights. She is well known for the role of the blue-skinned alien priestess Zotoh Zhaan in Farscape, for which she was nominated for best supporting actress by the Saturn Awards. She left the show early in the third season for health reasons: the blue makeup worn over her head and chest to achieve Zhaan's appearance caused her kidneys to bleed, subsequently causing a decline in her health.

Hey has also appeared in various Australian soap operas including Prisoner (Cell Block H) as Leigh Templar, Neighbours as Beth Travers, E Street as Jennifer St. James, and Pacific Drive as Margaux Hayes.

Since leaving Farscape, Hey has started her own company, White Flower Lei, which manufactures perfumes and soaps. She currently resides in the UK.

Meditation
Hey teaches meditation across the United States and UK, and is certified in natural therapy.

Filmography

Television

References

External links 

 

1952 births
20th-century Australian actresses
21st-century Australian actresses
Actresses from Sydney
Australian expatriate actresses in the United States
Australian film actresses
Australian television actresses
Living people
Reiki practitioners